The station of Mogliano Veneto is a railway station serving the town of Mogliano Veneto, in the region of Veneto, northern Italy. The station opened in 1851 and is located on the Venice–Udine railway. The train services are operated by Trenitalia.

History
The station was built in 1851 with the opening of the first section of the line between Mestre and Treviso. Initially this was single-track railway, the station was equipped with the only double track for passing trains (on the west side of the square). The number of tracks at the station was increased to three with the doubling of the line (track one became the second track, the central one) and in 1926 the passenger building was expanded. Until 2005 there was a third track used only by freight trains.

Until 1939 it was called simply Mogliano.

Modernisation

In 2007 the platforms were raised, works related to the Metropolitan Railway Service of Veneto.

Train services
The station is served by the following service(s):

Express services (Regionale Veloce) Trieste - Gorizia - Udine - Treviso - Venice
Regional services (Treno regionale) Trieste - Gorizia - Udine - Treviso - Venice

See also

History of rail transport in Italy
List of railway stations in Veneto
Rail transport in Italy
Railway stations in Italy

References

 This article is based upon a translation of the Italian language version as of January 2016.

External links

Railway stations in Veneto